Death at a Funeral is a 2010 American black comedy film directed by Neil LaBute with a screenplay by Dean Craig. It is a remake of  the 2007 British film of the same name that Craig wrote. The film features an ensemble cast including Chris Rock, Martin Lawrence, Danny Glover, Regina Hall, Peter Dinklage, James Marsden, Tracy Morgan, Loretta Devine, Zoë Saldaña, Columbus Short, Luke Wilson, Keith David, Ron Glass and Kevin Hart; Dinklage is the only actor to appear in  both films. The film was released in the United States on April 16, 2010.

Plot
A funeral service is being held for a man named Edward.  His older son Aaron and Aaron's wife Michelle live at his parents' home, but have been trying to buy their own and have children. Aaron's younger brother Ryan is a successful author, while Aaron (a tax accountant) has not yet completed his own novel, and resents that Ryan would rather spend money on a first class airline ticket than help pay for the funeral expenses.

Aaron and Ryan's cousin Elaine and her fiancé Oscar are on their way to pick up Elaine's brother Jeff before heading to the funeral. To ease Oscar's nerves, she gives him a pill from a bottle labeled as Valium. Jeff later reveals to Elaine that it is a powerful hallucinogenic drug he has concocted for a friend. Chaos ensues when Oscar hallucinates that the coffin is moving. He knocks it over, and the body falls out of the coffin.

Aaron is approached by an unknown guest named Frank, who reveals himself to be the secret lover of his late father. Frank shows Aaron photos as proof and threatens to reveal them to Aaron and Ryan's mother Cynthia unless he is paid $30,000. While in shock, Aaron relays the situation to Ryan, who suggests Aaron to pay the money because Ryan claims that he is in debt. When Aaron and Ryan meet with Frank to pay him, Frank starts to deride Aaron's ability as a writer and Aaron refuses to pay. Frank turns violent, but Aaron and Ryan subdue him, tying him up to prevent him from leaving. Family friend Norman enters the room, giving Frank several doses of what he also believes is Valium to try to calm him down. Jeff also enters the room, telling them that it is the same hallucinogen Oscar took earlier.

When Jeff and Norman, who are supposed to be watching Frank, get distracted by Uncle Russell, Frank releases himself from his bonds and is knocked unconscious upon falling over and hitting his head on a table. With Aaron, Ryan, Jeff and Norman believing that Frank is dead, they plan to put him in the coffin, and their opportunity comes when everyone is outside watching Oscar, who is on the roof naked and threatening to jump off the roof because he has seen Elaine's ex-boyfriend Derek kissing her. Elaine tells Oscar that Derek forcibly kissed her and calms him down by revealing she is pregnant. With everyone back inside, they continue the eulogy. While Aaron awkwardly tries to give his speech, Frank starts banging on the coffin, then suddenly forces it open and emerges. The pictures fall out of Frank's pocket, causing Cynthia to attack Frank in a berserk rage. Aaron yells for everyone's attention as he delivers a moving and impromptu eulogy, saying that his father was a good man with flaws like everyone else.

Aaron and Ryan say goodbye while Ryan gets a ride to the airport from Martina, whom he had been trying to seduce all day. Aaron and Michelle are finally alone when Aaron asks where Uncle Russell is. Michelle tells him that she gave him what she believes is Valium to calm him down, shocking Aaron. Uncle Russell sits on the roof naked, like Oscar had been, remarking that "everything's so f**king green..."

Cast

Reception
Review aggregator Rotten Tomatoes reports that 43% of critics have given the film a positive review, based on 138 reviews, with an average rating of 5.00/10. The site's critical consensus reads, "It's amusing and it assembles a talented cast, but Neil LaBute's surprisingly faithful remake of the 2007 Frank Oz dramedy ultimately falls short of the original." Another review aggregator, Metacritic, gave the film a weighted average score of 51 out of 100, based on 25 critics, indicating "mixed or average reviews". Audiences polled by CinemaScore gave the film an average grade of "B+" on an A+ to F scale.

Roger Ebert of the Chicago Sun-Times gave the film  out of 4 stars, believing it was better than the original. He wrote, "here's the best comedy since The Hangover ... a lot of Death at a Funeral is in very bad taste. That's when I laughed the most."

See also
List of black films of the 2010s

References

External links
 
 
 
 
 

2010 films
2010 black comedy films
African-American films
African-American LGBT-related films
American black comedy films
American LGBT-related films
American screwball comedy films
2010s English-language films
American remakes of British films
Films about funerals
Films directed by Neil LaBute
Films shot in California
Films shot in Los Angeles
Films scored by Christophe Beck
Sidney Kimmel Entertainment films
Films produced by Sidney Kimmel
Films produced by Chris Rock
Screen Gems films
Slapstick films
2010s American films